Are You the One? Brasil is a Brazilian reality television series on MTV (Brazil). It is a Brazilian version of the original American series. It follows 20 people who are living together in a tropical destination to find their perfect match. If the 10 men and 10 women are able to correctly choose all ten perfect matches in ten weeks, they will win R$500 thousand to split among them. Each episode the cast will pair up with whoever they believe their perfect match is to compete in a challenge. The winners of the challenge will go on a date, and have a chance to test their match in the truth booth. The cast members will choose one of the winning couples to go to the truth booth to determine if they are a perfect match or not. This is the only way to confirm matches. Each episode ends with a matching ceremony where the couples will be told how many perfect matches they have, but not which matches are correct. It debuted in February 2015 on MTV (Brazil).

Series overview

Season 1
Filmed in Rio de Janeiro, season one premiered on February 1, 2015.

Cast

Progress

Notes
 Confirmed Perfect Match
 Unconfirmed Perfect Match

Once the truth booths confirms a perfect match, that couple will go to the honeymoon suite and will automatically paired up for the remainder of the match ceremonies.

Truth Booths

Season 2
Filmed in Rio de Janeiro, season 2 premiered on January 17, 2016.

Cast

1 During Episode 6, it was found that Elisabetta was pregnant from a previous relationship. For this reason, she left the program and during the challenge Barbara was announced as a replacement.

Progress

Notes
 Confirmed Perfect Match
 Unconfirmed Perfect Match

Once the truth booths confirms a perfect match, that couple will go to the honeymoon suite and will automatically paired up for the remainder of the match ceremonies.

Truth Booths

Season 3
Filmed in Trancoso, Bahia, Season three premiered on January 29, 2017.

Cast

Progress

Notes
 Confirmed Perfect Match
 Unconfirmed Perfect Match

Once the truth booths confirms a perfect match, that couple will go to the honeymoon suite and will automatically paired up for the remainder of the match ceremonies.

Truth Booths

Season 4
Filmed in Búzios, Rio de Janeiro. The new host is Caio Castro. This time, one girl has two matches which means that there will be eleven boys, but only ten girls.

Cast

Progress

Notes
 Confirmed Perfect Match  Unconfirmed Perfect Match  This guy was not chosen in the match-up ceremony

Once the truth booth confirms a perfect match, that couple will go to the honeymoon suite and will automatically be paired up for the remainder of the match ceremonies.

Truth Booths

References

External links
 

Brazilian reality television series
2015 Brazilian television series debuts
2018 Brazilian television series endings
MTV original programming
Brasil
Television shows set in Brazil